Jules Ferdinand Fallou (9 August 1812, in Paris – 19 June 1895, in Paris) was a French entomologist who specialised in Lepidoptera and Coleoptera.

Jules Fallou was a manufacturer of surgical instruments. His collection of European Lepidoptera, mostly from France and Switzerland is  held by Muséum national d'histoire naturelle in Paris. He was a Member of the Société entomologique de France.

Works
Descriptive papers in Annales de la Société Entomologique de France.

References
Anonym 1895: [Biographien] Zoologischer Anzeiger, Leipzig 18: 404, 436
Anonym 1895: [Fallou, J. F.] The Entomologist's Monthly Magazine, Third Series, London 31:221-222
Anonym 1895: [Fallou, J. F.] Entomological News, Philadelphia 6:340
Laboulbène, A. 1897: [Fallou, J. F.] Annales de la Société Entomologique de France, Paris 66:106-108, 156–164, Portrait

French lepidopterists
1812 births
1895 deaths
Scientists from Paris
19th-century French zoologists